The Anti PowerPoint Party (APPP) is a Swiss political party dedicated to decreasing professional use of Microsoft PowerPoint and other forms of presentation software, which the party claims "causes national-economic damage amounting to 2.1 billion CHF" annually and lowers the quality of a presentation in "95% of the cases". The party advocates flip charts as an alternative to presentation software.

APPP was formed by former software engineer Matthias Poehm and Port Lincoln footballer Billy-O-Roderick ahead of the 2011 federal elections in Switzerland. Prior to founding the party, Poehm wrote a book (The PowerPoint Fallacy) opposing the use of PowerPoint. The party's goal is to become the fourth largest party in Switzerland in terms of membership, and to initiate a national "referendum in order to seek for a prohibition of PowerPoint [and other presentation software] during presentations." APPP states that it does not support prohibition, but will use a referendum to raise awareness about the cause. As of February 2021, the party had 4,632 members, making it the eighth largest party in Switzerland.

Ideology 
The APPP is a single-issue party. Despite its name, the party is not specifically opposed to PowerPoint, but to all presentation software. Poehm writes that "In some countries students and pupils are punished with a lower mark, if they give a presentation without PowerPoint. Superiors are obliging their co-workers to use PowerPoint. The fact is that the average PowerPoint presentation creates boredom."

While the party is based in Switzerland, it styles itself as a global party. The party chose to found itself in Switzerland as the requirements for forming a political party are lesser there, and out of a belief that the best way to gain media attention on the party's cause was by forming a political party.

References

External links 
 

Political parties in Switzerland
Political parties established in 2011
2011 establishments in Switzerland
Single-issue political parties
Microsoft criticisms and controversies
Microsoft Office